Haggerston is a locale in East London, England, centred approximately on Great Cambridge Street (now renamed Queensbridge Road). It is within the London Borough of Hackney and is considered to be a part of London's East End. It is about 3.1 miles (5 km) northeast of Charing Cross.

The adjacent neighbourhoods are Dalston (to the north), Hoxton (to the west) and Bethnal Green (to the south east). Haggerston historically formed part of Shoreditch borough, and was divided into the following ecclesiastical parishes: All Saints, St Chad, St Columba, St Mary, St Paul, St Augustine, and St Stephen.

In 1965, the Metropolitan Borough of Shoreditch became part of the new London Borough of Hackney. There is an electoral ward called Haggerston within the borough. In the 1990s a number of the area's more rundown housing estates were refurbished and some disused public buildings were privately converted into gated communities. In 2010, Haggerston Railway station re-opened, a little to the north of the original station.

History 
Haggerston is first recorded in the Domesday Book as Hergotestane, possibly of Viking origin, and an outlying hamlet of Shoreditch. On Rocque's 1745 map of Hackney, the village is shown as Agostone but by the 19th century it had become Haggerstone, and part of the growing urban sprawl, with factories and streets of workers' cottages lining the canal.

Today 
The proximity to Hoxton and Shoreditch has made the area popular with students and workers in the creative industries, as these nearby areas have grown more expensive. In recent years, escalating property prices have driven commercial art galleries further into east London, which has exacerbated this effect. For the same reason, Haggerston has been attracting tech start ups over Silicon Roundabout in Old Street, with some people calling the area "Hackerston".

A shortage of secondary school places has made the area less attractive to families but this is likely to change with the building of The Bridge Academy on Laburnum Street.

Governance 
The Haggerston electoral ward forms part of the Hackney South and Shoreditch constituency. The ward returns three councillors to Hackney Council, with an election every four years. At the election on 6 May 2010, Ann Munn, Jonathan McShane, and Barry Buitekant, all Labour Party candidates, were returned. Turnout was 54 per cent; with 5,006 votes cast. Current councillors (2020) for the Haggerston ward are Ajay Chauhan, Humaira Garasia and Patrick Spence.

Geography

Education 
Secondary schools in the area include Haggerston School and The Bridge Academy.

Landmarks 
Haggerston School is a Grade II listed building, designed by the modernist architect Ernő Goldfinger and built in 1964–65.

Culture 

Besides the Regent's Canal, Haggerston Park, on the site of a demolished gasworks on Hackney Road, provides much-needed open space in the area. Also in the area is the Hackney City Farm. The Regent Estate provides the Regent Estate Pensioners Club/Hall and the Regent Estate Community Centre/Hall which together provide community services and spaces for hire. The Regent Estate Pensioners Hall is also used as a polling station.

The Grade II listed Haggerston Pool, designed by Alfred Cross and opened in 1904, was closed in 2000. In June 2009, after a long community campaign, a £5m grant was announced from the Department for Children, Schools and Families to refurbish and reopen the pool. The building would also contain community facilities and a GP surgery.

This area of Hackney has a long association with clowning. Holy Trinity Church still hosts an annual clowns' service to commemorate Joseph Grimaldi and All Saints Centre at one time housed the Clowns Gallery and Museum, including props and a unique collection of painted eggs, serving as the 'registration' of clowns' make-up. Much of the collection is now on display at Wookey Hole. Other Anglican churches in Haggerston are All Saints, Haggerston Road; St Columba, Kingsland Road; and Sts Mary and Chad, Nichols Square. The Little Sisters of Jesus have had a community of sisters within Fellows Court, Haggerston, since 1990.

Many Vietnamese, Cambodian and Laotian people have formed communities in Haggerston and nearby Shoreditch. Outside the area, the most visible sign of this is the profusion of Southeast Asian restaurants on nearby Kingsland Road in Shoreditch and on Mare Street in Hackney. There is also a notable Russian community focused on bars and cafés along Kingsland Road.

Haggerston is home to The Free Association improvised comedy theatre and school.

Transport

Railway stations 

 Haggerston station, served by London Overground.

Walking and cycling 
The Regents Canal towpath is easily accessible to pedestrians and cyclists. It provides access to Victoria Park to the east and Islington to the west.

Public art
The condemned Haggerston and Kingsland Estate was scheduled for demolition in the 1990s but the process did not get underway for another 20 years. In 2009 the artists Andrea Luka Zimmerman and Lasse Johansson, who lived on the Haggerston Estate on Dunston Road, created the I AM HERE project, placing on the building large portrait photographs of the current estate residents who were about to be moved out so the building could be demolished. These faced the Regent's Canal and were popular with passersby. The project came down in April 2014.

A feature film Estate, a Reverie (83 mins, Zimmerman) about the Haggerston estate was completed in 2015. Filmed over seven years, Estate, a Reverie reveals and celebrates the resilience of residents who are profoundly overlooked by media representations and wider social responses. The film was nominated for several awards, including the 2015 Grierson awards.

On the Kingsland Estate in Whiston Road, Egyptian painter Nazir Tanbouli created the "King's Land" project where, in the space of four months, he covered all of the buildings of the condemned estate with murals. The Kingsland Estate was demolished in late 2013.

Little Sisters of Jesus 
The Little Sisters of Jesus are a Roman Catholic community of religious sisters inspired by the life and writings of Charles de Foucauld, founded in Algeria in 1939 by Little Sister Magdeleine of Jesus (Madeleine Hutin).  They have had a community of Sisters at their council flat on the 13th Floor of Fellows Court Tower Block in Weymouth Terrace, Haggerston since 1989.

Notable people 

 Frank Buttle (1878–1953), Vicar of St Chad's, (1937-1953), founder of the National Adoption Society and Buttle UK
 Randal Cremer (1828–1908), Liberal MP for Haggerston (1885-1895 & 1900–1908), winner of the 1903 Nobel Peace Prize
 Edmund Halley (1656–1742), astronomer,
 Kray Twins, (Ronald, 1933–1995) & Reginald, (1933–2000)  criminals and perpetrators of organised crime.
 Iain Sinclair FRSL (born 1943), a writer and filmmaker.
 Nazir Tanbouli (born 1971), an Egyptian born artist
 Rachel Whiteread DBE (born 1963), an artist who produces sculptures in the form of casts.
 Andrea Luka Zimmerman (born 1969), & Lasse Johansson; artists, filmmakers and cultural activists; transforming the Haggerston estate with the large-scale public art & photography.

References

Further reading

 Jones, T. E. (2003?) Father Wilson of Haggerston: a life simply offered. London: Anglo Catholic History Society (biography of Herbert Arthur Wilson of St Augustine's church, Haggerston)

External links

 Haggerston Community Centre
 Opening Haggerston Pool 1904
 Hackney City Farm
 Haggerston ward profile
 Labour Party profile of Jonathan McShane
 Labour Party profile of Barry Buitekant
 The Clowns' Gallery, Museum and Archive
 London Natural History Society website "one of the largest societies of its kind anywhere in the world"
 Terrence Mahoney's Wartime memories of Haggerston

 
Districts of the London Borough of Hackney
Areas of London